Arima brachyptera is a species of leaf beetle in the genus Arima. Sexual dwarphism is present in the species.

References

Galerucinae
Beetles described in 1844